Wat Kamphaeng Bang Chak is an ancient Thai Buddhist temple in Mahā Nikāya sect in Thonburi side (west side of Chao Phraya River) of Bangkok, considered as one of the oldest and most dominant temples in Bangkok.

The temple is believed to have been built since the late Ayutthaya period without knowing the exact history. But believe that many major renovations have been made especially during the reigns of King Rama III and Rama V.

The mural inside the ordination hall depicts the story of Mahanipata Jataka (10 previous lives of the Lord Buddha). Principal Buddha image in Māravijaya posture named Luang Pho Butsarakham enshrined inside, the overall appearance of the ordination hall is an art in the late Ayutthaya period. But the materials that decorate various parts was influenced by Chinese architectural style, which is a popular pattern in the reign of King Rama III.

Wat Kamphaeng Bang Chak has a total of seven chedi yo mum mai sip song (twelve indented corners chedi). The first one is on the south of the ordination hall, the base of the chedi outside is always located along the temple wall. While the other is currently in the area of the Baan Sinlapin (The Artist's House). Both chedis are about 10 meters (32 feet) high and they are now disintegrated over time.

Wat Kamphaeng Bang Chak is located next to the Baan Sinlapin also known as The Artist's House, a centuries-old wooden Thai house turned gallery, with local artwork, photography and puppet theater by Khlong Bangkok Yai.

Gallery

References

Phasi Charoen district
Buddhist temples in Bangkok
Unregistered ancient monuments in Bangkok
18th-century Buddhist temples